Ryszard Rybak (born 27 January 1960) is a Polish former professional footballer who played as a midfielder.

References

1960 births
Living people
Polish footballers
Association football midfielders
Olimpia Poznań players
Lech Poznań players
FC St. Pauli players
Lyon La Duchère players
Dyskobolia Grodzisk Wielkopolski players
Ekstraklasa players
Polish expatriate footballers
Expatriate footballers in Germany
Polish expatriate sportspeople in Germany
Expatriate footballers in France
Polish expatriate sportspeople in France